Sidney Marsh (born 31 August 1939) is an Australian former wrestler. He competed at the 1964 Summer Olympics and the 1968 Summer Olympics.

References

External links
 

1939 births
Living people
Australian male sport wrestlers
Olympic wrestlers of Australia
Wrestlers at the 1964 Summer Olympics
Wrestlers at the 1968 Summer Olympics
Sportsmen from New South Wales
Commonwealth Games medallists in wrestling
Commonwealth Games silver medallists for Australia
Wrestlers at the 1962 British Empire and Commonwealth Games
20th-century Australian people
21st-century Australian people
Medallists at the 1962 British Empire and Commonwealth Games